is a  tall mountain of the Daikō Mountains. It is located on the border of Higashiyoshino, Nara, and Matsusaka, Mie, Japan

Kunimi
Kunimi